Wyoming Roundup is a 1952 American Western film directed by Thomas Carr and written by Daniel B. Ullman. The film stars Whip Wilson, Tommy Farrell, Phyllis Coates, Richard Emory, Robert J. Wilke and I. Stanford Jolley. The film was released on November 9, 1952, by Monogram Pictures.

Plot

Cast          
Whip Wilson as Whip Wilson
Tommy Farrell as Bob Burke
Phyllis Coates as Terry Howard
Richard Emory as Jack Craven
Robert J. Wilke as Clem Wyatt
I. Stanford Jolley as Earl Craven 
House Peters Jr. as Kent Randolph
Henry Rowland as Bill Howard
Stanley Price as Clark Jackson
Lyle Talbot as Franklin
Frank Jaquet as Doctor
Rocky Shahan as Stagecoach Driver

References

External links
 

1952 films
American Western (genre) films
1952 Western (genre) films
Monogram Pictures films
Films directed by Thomas Carr
Films scored by Raoul Kraushaar
American black-and-white films
1950s English-language films
1950s American films